The World Is Yours is the second studio album by American rapper Scarface. It was released on August 17, 1993, by Rap-A-Lot Records and Priority Records. The album was not as acclaimed as his debut, Mr. Scarface Is Back, but sold strongly, breaking into the Top 10 on the Billboard 200 chart, and peaking at number 1 on the R&B/hip hop album chart. "Let Me Roll" became a Billboard Hot 100 hit in 1993. The album was certified Gold by the RIAA on October 20, 1993.

Track listing

Charts

Weekly charts

Year-end charts

Certifications

See also
List of number-one R&B albums of 1993 (U.S.)

References

1993 albums
Scarface (rapper) albums
Rap-A-Lot Records albums
Priority Records albums
Albums produced by N.O. Joe